Mike Andreas Egger (born 2 August 1992, in Rorschach) is a Swiss politician and a member of the National Council of States representing St Gallen on the ticket of Swiss People's Party (SVP), since 2019. He is co-president of the parliamentary group, and serves on the committees for Environment, Spatial Planning and Energy, Finance and Sports.

Early life 
Egger was raised in Berneck with his three sisters. He had meat specialist training in Disentis where he finished with a distinction in June 2011. Following the training, he was employed by a meat processor Micarna in 2014 and became a board member of St Gallen – Liechtenstein Meat Association in 2016.

Political career 
His interest in politics aroused in 2013 at a youth parliamentary session he attended. Later he joined Young SVP group in the Canton of St Gallen and chaired the group from 2012 to 2016. While holding this position, he was elected to the Cantonal Council and served in the council until February 2019. In the 2015 parliamentary election, Egger ran on the ticket of SVP for the National Council but lost by 600 votes to his opponent. Following the resignation of Toni Brunner from parliament in November 2018, Egger was inaugurated to the National Council in March 2019.

He ran for a Council of State seat in January and March 2019 to succeed Karin Keller-Sutter but lost in both elections as he placed third position. He was elected to the parliament in the October 2019 parliamentary elections and was appointed to the committees on Environment, Spatial Planning and Energy, Sports and Finance.

References 

Living people
1992 births
Swiss politicians
Swiss People's Party politicians